The Butchers (also known as Maxie and Murderer's Keep) is a 1970 thriller directed by Paulmichael Miekhe and distributed by Troma Entertainment.

Plot
The film follows a deaf girl who witnesses a dead body being stashed in a nearby butcher shop. Not wanting to take the risk of being caught, the murderous butchers decide to kidnap her.

Cast
Robert Walden
Vic Tayback
Talia Shire 
Donald Pleasence

Home media
The film was released on DVD on May 31, 2005.

External links

References

1970 films
American independent films
Troma Entertainment films
1970s thriller films
1970s English-language films
1970s American films